John Jefferson Davis is Professor of Systematic Theology and Christian Ethics at Gordon-Conwell Theological Seminary, where he has taught since 1975. He is an ordained Presbyterian pastor (Presbyterian Church USA).

Thought

Davis has been actively publishing in ethics and systematic theology for nearly three decades. His most influential debates involve women's ordination, or Christian Egalitarianism. Davis has also taken part in a popular debate with John Sanders over Open Theism.

Works

Books

Chapters
 
 
  - ebook only

References

Gordon–Conwell Theological Seminary faculty
Year of birth missing (living people)
Living people
Duke University alumni